The men's épée was one of ten fencing events on the fencing at the 2000 Summer Olympics programme. It was the twenty-third appearance of the event. The competition was held on 16 September 2000. 42 fencers from 22 nations competed. Each nation was limited to three fencers. The event was won by Pavel Kolobkov of Russia, the nation's second consecutive victory in the men's individual épée (Aleksandr Beketov had won in 1996). Russia joined a five-way tie for third-most gold medals in the event at two (behind Italy at six and France at five). Kolobkov, who had a silver medal in 1992 representing the Unified Team, was the 11th man to win multiple medals in the event. France's Hugues Obry took silver in Sydney, returning France to the podium after a one-Games absence snapped a four-Games medal streak. Lee Sang-ki earned South Korea's first medal in the event with his bronze.

Background

This was the 23rd appearance of the event, which was not held at the first Games in 1896 (with only foil and sabre events held) but has been held at every Summer Olympics since 1900.

Three of the eight quarterfinalists from 1996 returned: silver medalist Iván Trevejo of Cuba, fourth-place finisher Iván Kovács of Hungary, and seventh-place finisher Kaido Kaaberma of Estonia. Also returning were 1992 gold medalist Éric Srecki of France and silver medalist Pavel Kolobkov of the Unified Team (representing Russia since 1996), both of whom had been defeated in the Round of 16 in 1996, as well as 1988 gold medalist Arnd Schmitt of West Germany (now Germany). Schmitt was the reigning World Champion, having won in 1999. Srecki had won both World Championships before (1995) and after (1997) his Olympic victory. Hugues Obry (1998) and Kolobkov (1993 and 1994) joined them, with the Sydney field including the last four World Champions having won the last six World Championships.

Kazakhstan, Kyrgyzstan, and Ukraine each made their debut in the event. France, Sweden, and the United States each appeared for the 21st time, tied for most among nations.

Competition format

The competition continued to use the entirely single-elimination (with bronze medal match) format introduced in 1996. All bouts were to 15 touches.

Schedule

All times are Australian Eastern Standard Time (UTC+10)

Results

Preliminary round

As there were more than 32 entrants in this event, ten first round matches were held to reduce the field to 32 fencers.

Main tournament bracket

The remaining field of 32 fencers competed in a single-elimination tournament to determine the medal winners. Semifinal losers proceeded to a bronze medal match.

Results summary

References

Epee Men
Men's events at the 2000 Summer Olympics